Ig Publishing is a New York-based press devoted to publishing original literary fiction and political and cultural nonfiction. The editor is writer Robert Lasner, and the publisher is Elizabeth Clementson. The press was founded in 2002.

Among Ig's awards are a PEN/Hemingway Honorable Mention for Damn Love by Jasmine Beach-Ferrara, an Indie Next selection for Rachel Weaver's Point of Direction, a Sydney Taylor Honor book selection for Isabel's War by Lila Perl, a 5 Under 35 pick for The Hopeful, an ALA Notable pick in fiction for Missile Paradise, a Montana Book Award Honorable Mention for A Bloom of Bones, a Center for Fiction First Novel Prize Shortlist Selection  a 2018 CLMP Firecracker nomination for Empire of Glass, a Center For Fiction longlist selection for Restless Souls, a Great Group Reads selection for Unfurled. Ig's titles have been reviewed in The New York Times, Booklist, Kirkus, Publishers Weekly, Library Journal, The Los Angeles Times, The Wall Street Journal, Oprah Magazine, the Chicago Tribune, NPR, and many other places.

History

Ig was founded in 2002 with the release of Robert Lasner's novel For Fucks Sake. The press also released a series of Dive Bar guides to select cities – New York, Chicago and San Francisco – from 2002 to 2004. Ig also released several literary novels, including Grant Bailie's Cloud 8 and Richard Madelin's Careful!

Inspired by the rise of the progressive political blogosphere, Ig began publishing political non-fiction, along with literary fiction. Among the blog books that Ig released were Confessions of a Former Dittohead (2006), Framing the Debate by Jeffrey Feldman, Moving A Nation to Care by Ilona Meagher, and Steeplejacking: How the Christian Right is Hijacking Mainstream Religion by John Dorhauer and Sheldon Culver (all in 2007).

During this time, Ig also re-published several non-fiction classics, including Edward Bernays's Propaganda, Vance Packard's The Hidden Persuaders, and Empire As A Way of Life by William Appleman Williams.

Increasing reputation in politics

Ig's political list continued to grow, as the press gained a reputation as an important voice in progressive political publishing. In December 2007, Moving A Nation to Care: Post-Traumatic Stress Disorder and America's Returning Troops was highlighted before Congress when its author was called to testify at a House Committee on Veterans' Affairs hearing. And, in the lead-up to the 2008 election, Ig published Loser Take All: Election Fraud and The Subversion of Democracy, 2000-2008, highlighting the vast electoral fraud in the 2000, 2002, 2004 and 2006 elections. The collection was edited by Mark Crispin Miller.

Other political highlights for the press were Jill Richardson's Recipe for America (2009) on the American food system; union activist Joe Burns on the need for the labor movement to bring back the production-halting strike, Reviving the Strike (2011), and its companion title, Strike Back (2014) on the rising public employee labor upsurge; Crow After Roe, on the state-level war against abortion; and Part of the Family, about the rising movement to gain rights for domestic workers.

In 2013, Ig released The Terror Factory: Inside the FBI's Manufactured War on Terrorism by award-winning investigative journalist Trevor Aaronson. An outgrowth of Aaronson's article for Mother Jones magazine, The Terror Factory exposed how the FBI, under the guise of engaging in counterterrorism since 9/11, built a network of more than 15,000 informants whose primary purpose is to infiltrate Muslim communities to create and facilitate phony terrorist plots so that the Bureau can then claim it is winning the war on terror.

In 2016, Ig published Boy With A Knife by Jean Trounstine. Boy With A Knife tells the story of Karter Kane Reed, who, at the age of sixteen, was sentenced to life in an adult prison for a murder he committed in 1993 in a high school classroom. Twenty years later, in 2013, he became one of the few men in Massachusetts to sue the Parole Board and win his freedom.

Recent political/current affairs titles have included American Apartheid: The Native American Struggle for Self-Determination and Inclusion by Stephanie Woodard, which offers the most comprehensive and compelling account of the issues and threats that Native Americans face today, as well as their heroic battle to overcome them; The Tribalization of Politics by Ian Reifowitz, which explores how the conservative radio host Rush Limbaugh “tribalized” American politics through his racially divisive, falsehood-ridden portrayal of President Obama; an updated edition of Strike Back by Joe Burns; The End of Roe v. Wade by Robin Marty and Jessica Mason Pieklo; and Why America Needs Socialism by G.S. Griffin. In 2021, Ig released The Heartbeat of Iran by Tara Kangarlou, and in 2022, Putin's Trolls: On the Frontlines of Russia's Disinformation War Against the World by Jessikka Aro. In the book, the author, a Finnish journalist, writes about being targeted by Russian social media trolls.

Literary fiction

Ig is particularly known for its literary fiction. In 2012, the press released The Care and Feeding of Exotic Pets by Diana Wagman, which was named a Barnes and Noble Discover pick. In 2014, Ig released Point of Direction by Rachel Weaver, which was named an Indie Next selection. Ig has had multiple titles reviewed by prestigious publications including The New York Times, NPR, Publishers Weekly, Oprah Magazine, Kirkus Reviews and Booklist. Damn Love, a short story collection by Jasmine Beach-Ferrara, received a PEN/Hemingway Honorable Mention in 2014. In 2015, Tracy O'Neill's The Hopeful was named a 5 Under 35 pick by the National Book Foundation. The press's fiction list has won several more awards since then, including the CLMP Firecracker Award in Fiction in 2022 for Celeste Mohammed's Pleasantview, a novel-in-stories set in Trinidad.

Bookmarked

In 2016, Ig launched its Bookmarked series, where an author writes on a book that had a profound impact on their writing and life. Kirby Gann authored the first book in the series, on John Knowles' A Separate Peace. Other titles that first year included Curtis Smith on Kurt Vonnegut's Slaughterhouse-Five, and Hobart editor Aaron Burch on Stephen King's The Body. Titles in the series since then include Jaime Clarke on Fitzgerald's The Great Gatsby, David Ryan on Malcolm Lowry's Under the Volcano, Steve Yarbrough on Larry McMurtry's The Last Picture Show, Michael Seidlinger on Mark Danielewski's House of Leaves, Brian Evenson on Raymond Carver's What We Talk About When We Talk About Love, Charles Holdefer on George Saunders' Pastoralia, Steve Almond on John Williams's Stoner, Kim McLarin on James Baldwin's Another Country, Sven Birkerts on Nabokov's Speak, Memory, Pamela Erens on George Eliot's Middlemarch, and Robin Black on Virginia Woolf's Mrs. Dalloway.

References

Further reading
 
 

Publishing companies established in 2002
Book publishing companies based in New York (state)
Companies based in Brooklyn